The House of Nobility either refers to the institution of the Finnish nobility or the palace of the noble estate. The Finnish nobility was until 1906 the first of the four estates of the realm.

The Estate 

The estate of nobility existed fully starting from the 1809 Diet of Porvoo, and was formally organized in 1818.

Families of Finnish nobility were registered in the rolls of the Finnish House of Nobility, through a process called introduction to one's peers, after the royal/imperial creation.

First introductions in 1818 were registrations of those noble families registered in the Swedish House of Nobility whose male members lived in Finland and had sworn fealty to the emperor.

During the period of Finland being a Grand Duchy to Russia, a number of de novo creations and naturalizations were made by the Russian emperors. The first estate of the four estates of the realm of Finland existed until 1906 when a single chamber parliament was introduced. Baron August Langhoff was the last to be ennobled, in 1912. Hence, Finnish nobility today is a closed society. Today the House of Nobility is a hereditary association of members of registered nobility.

The families introduced to the Finnish House of Nobility together with a brief description of the origins of the family and the coats of arms are listed on the House of Nobility website.

The Ritarihuone / Riddarhuset building 

The Finnish House of Nobility as corporation owns, since 1857, the assembly building completed in 1862.

The building, called Ritarihuone in Finnish and Riddarhuset in Swedish, (House of Knights) is of Neogothic style by G.T. Chiewitz. The building is located in Kruununhaka, downtown Helsinki. The block and its land is owned collectively by the Finnish nobility. There are the offices of the House, for example its General Secretary, the Chancellery, and the Genealogist as well as a library, archives and heraldic collections.

Lord Marshals 

Traditionally, the Lord Marshal was the chairman of sessions of the noble class (House of Nobility) as well as the overall speaker of the Diet. The persons who held the office of Lord Marshal in various diet sessions, are listed below:

1809 count Robert Wilhelm De Geer
1863–1864 Lieutenant General Johan Nordenstam
1867 Johan Nordenstam
1872 Johan Nordenstam
1877–1878 Johan von Born
1882 baron Samuel Verner von Troil
1885 baron Samuel Verner von Troil
1888 Gabriel von Haartman
1891 Gabriel von Haartman
1894 Lars von Hellens
1897 baron Samuel Verner von Troil
1899 (extraordinary diet) baron Samuel Verner von Troil
1900 Counselor of State professor Lorentz Lindelöf
1904–1905 Constantin Linder (1904), Ossian Wuorenheimo (1905)
1905–1906 (extraordinary diet) Viktor Magnus von Born

See also

 List of Finnish noble families

References

External links

 Finland's House of Nobility

Grand Duchy of Finland
 
Kruununhaka